Alexander Bittner (16 March 1850, in Friedland – 31 March 1902, in Vienna) was an Austrian paleontologist and geologist.

Following graduation from the University of Vienna in 1873, he remained in Vienna as an assistant to Eduard Suess. In 1874-76 he conducted geological research in Italy and Greece, followed by an internship at the Imperial Institute of Geology in Vienna (1877). In 1897 he was appointed chief geologist of the institute.

Bittner is known for his stratigraphic-paleontological research of the eastern Alps, especially studies involving brachiopods from the Alpine Triassic Period. He was among the first scientists to study the effects of the Belluno earthquake that occurred in northern Italy on 29 June 1873.

Selected works 
 Vorschläge für eine Normirung der Regeln der stratigraphischen Nomenclatur, 1879 - Proposal for a normalization of rules for stratigraphic nomenclature.
 Die geologischen verhältnisse von Hernstein in Niederosterreich und der weiteren umgebung, 1882 - Geological conditions of Hernstein in Lower Austria, etc.
 Beiträge zur Kenntniss tertiärer Brachyuren-Faunen, 1884 - Contribution to the knowledge of Tertiary Brachyura.
 Brachiopoden der Alpinen Trias, 1890 - Brachiopods of the Alpine Triassic.
 Neue Koninckiniden des alpinen Lias, 1893 - New Koninckiniden of the Alpine Lias.    
 Lamellibranchiaten der Alpinen Trias, 1895 - Lamellibranchia of the Alpine Triassic.

References

External links
 

1850 births
1902 deaths
University of Vienna alumni
19th-century Austrian geologists
Austrian paleontologists
People from Frýdlant
Burials at the Vienna Central Cemetery
German Bohemian people
Austrian people of German Bohemian descent